The Royal Musical Association (RMA) is a British scholarly society and charity. Founded in 1874, the Association claims to be the second oldest musicological society in the world, after that of the Netherlands. Activities include organizing and sponsoring academic conferences in the United Kingdom, and making awards for outstanding scholarship, notably the annual Dent Medal.

History
The society was founded by Sir John Stainer and was originally titled the Musical Association with a subtitle 'the investigation and discussion of subjects connected with the Art and Science of Music'. Sir Frederick Ouseley, Stainer's teacher, was the first president. The Association was registered as a company in 1904 and as a charity in 1965. The Association was renamed the Royal Musical Association in 1944 following the orders of King George VI.

Publications
The Association publishes the Journal of the Royal Musical Association. Before 1987, the Journal was known as the Proceedings of the Royal Musical Association (often abbreviated PMRA;  and ), and before 1945 as the Proceedings of the Musical Association (see  for print holdings from 1878 to 1986). The RMA has also published a series of monographs and the Royal Musical Association Research Chronicle that has generally come out yearly since 1961, published by Taylor & Francis.

References

External links

Charity Commission Register
Hugh Cobbe, "The Royal Musical Association 1874–1901", Proceedings of the Royal Musical Association, Vol. 110, (1983–1984), pp. 111–117
Alec Hyatt King and Julian Rushton. "Royal Musical Association", in Grove Music Online, (accessed June 15, 2010). 

1874 establishments in the United Kingdom
Organizations established in 1874
Music-related professional associations
Music organisations based in the United Kingdom
Musicology